Phillip George Evatt  is a former Australian jurist who serviced as a judge on the Federal Court of Australia from 1977–1987. Evatt holds a Bachelor of Laws from the University of Sydney. He served as Lieutenant in the Royal Australian Navy from 1940–1946, including on the British submarine HMS Tapir. He was awarded the Distinguished Service Cross for his part in the sinking of German submarine U-486 in 1945. Evatt was admitted as a barrister in New South Wales in 1951. During his career as a jurist, he served on several courts including the Supreme Court of the Northern Territory (1976–1987), the Supreme Court of the Australian Capital Territory (1974–1987), and the Supreme Court of Norfolk Island (1981–1987). Evatt presided over a Royal Commission into the use of chemical agents in the Vietnam War.

References 

Australian judges
20th-century Australian judges
Judges of the Federal Court of Australia
Living people
Australian jurists
University of Sydney alumni
Recipients of the Distinguished Service Cross (Australia)
Year of birth missing (living people)